2017 Rugby League World Cup Group C was one of four groups in the 2017 Rugby League World Cup. The group comprised Papua New Guinea, Wales and Ireland. Papua New Guinea topped the group and therefore qualified for the 2017 Rugby League World Cup knockout stage.

Overall

Papua New Guinea vs Wales

Ireland vs Italy (Inter-Group)

Papua New Guinea vs Ireland

Fiji vs Wales (Inter-Group)

Papua New Guinea vs United States (Inter-Group)

Wales vs Ireland

References

2017 Rugby League World Cup